The Samoa women's national under-20 football team is the highest women's youth team of women's football in Samoa and is controlled by the Samoan Football Federation.

Information

Records

OFC Championship Record

Current technical staff

Current squad
The following players were called up for the 2019 OFC U-19 Women's Championship from 30 August–12 September in Avarua, the Cook Islands.

Caps and goals updated as of 7 September 2019, after the game against Tahiti.

2017 Squad
The following players were called up for the 2017 OFC U-19 Women's Championship

Caps and goals correct after match against Papua New Guinea on 24 July 2017.

Squad for the 2015 OFC U-20 Women's Championship

Caps and goals correct after match against New Zealand on 10 October 2015.

References

External links
Samoa Football Federation page
Oceania Football Federation page

Football in Samoa
Oceanian women's national under-20 association football teams
U